Noida City Centre (also called Wave City Center) is a station on the Blue Line of the Delhi Metro. Trains from here go to Dwarka Sector 21 metro station and Noida Electronic City metro station.

Repair in 2013

Problem Reported 
During a routine check in September 2013, DMRC found that the station was sinking with major cracks appearing in it. However, the officials were not able to ascertain the reason or cause for the sagging. Further inspection of other nearby Stations were made and no problems were found there.

Consequences 
Though no trains were cancelled by DMRC, the travel time from the Noida Golf Course metro station to this station increased. The trains were only allowed to run in a very slow pace near this station, as repair work was going on in the station and on pillars 174 and 185.
The services of the station had to be shut down for few days

Reaction 
DMRC constituted a committee to look into the cause of the problem. an engineer was dismissed following the report submitted by the committee.

Station

Station layout

Facilities
List of available ATM at Noida City Centre metro station are HDFC Bank, Punjab National Bank

Entry/Exit

Connections

Bus
Delhi Transport Corporation bus routes number 34, 323, 347, 347A, 555  serves the station from outside metro station stop.

See also

Delhi
Noida
List of Delhi Metro stations
Transport in Delhi
Delhi Metro Rail Corporation
Delhi Suburban Railway
Delhi Monorail
Delhi Transport Corporation
South East Delhi
New Delhi
National Capital Region (India)
Noida–Greater Noida Expressway
Noida Metro
List of rapid transit systems
List of metro systems

References

External links

 Delhi Metro Rail Corporation Ltd. (Official site) 
 Delhi Metro Annual Reports
 
 UrbanRail.Net – Descriptions of all metro systems in the world, each with a schematic map showing all stations.

Delhi Metro stations
Railway stations opened in 2009
Railway stations in Gautam Buddh Nagar district
Transport in Noida